Riding for My Life is an autobiography by horse-racing jockey Julie Krone, with Nancy Richardson. It serves as part of the basis for the upcoming film The Boys Club.

Plot

Julie Krone is the world's greatest ever female horse racing jockey. By age 25, Julie was the first woman ever to win a riding title at a major track, the first woman ever to win five races in one day at a New York track, and one of three jockeys ever to win six races on one card. In 1993, she became the first female winner of a Triple Crown race, riding 14-to-1 long-shot Colonial Affair to victory in the Belmont Stakes—"showing the patience, intelligence and tactical savvy that have made her one of the nation's leading performers," wrote William Nack of Sports Illustrated.

The Boys Club follows Julie's struggles in her tomboy childhood in rural Michigan and her early-career drug use, her battles with fellow jockies and the media and her climb up the jockey success ladder, the horrific 1993 racetrack accident that crushed her leg and chest, and her painful determination to make a comeback - all part of her hard-hitting fight to become a female jockey in the male-dominated world of horse racing.

Despite a series of debilitating falls and challenges, by the time Julie retired in 1999, she had won 3,545 races and more than $81 million in purse earnings.

First edition
Little Brown & Co, 1995.

Film adaptation
Julie Krone was one of the greatest jockeys of all time. The Boys Club is her story...

The Boys Club is a film adaptation of Julie Krone's biography, Riding for My Life. A vivid look at the world of horse racing, The Boys Club explores one woman’s battle against sexual inequality in the classic tale of an underdog’s passage toward victory. It is based on the true story of Julie Krone's rise to fame and unparalleled success as a horse racing jockey. The film is written by award-winning filmmaker Katherine Brooks, and will be produced by Sophie Watts and executive produced by John Manulis. 
The film  project was retitled as "freak".

Production
The Boys Club is currently in pre-production.

See also
Katherine Brooks
U.S. National Museum of Racing and Hall of Fame
Thoroughbred horse racing

References

External links
Official Movie Site
Official Twitter Site
The Official MySpace Site
The Official Katherine Brooks Site

1995 non-fiction books
American autobiographies
Non-fiction books about horse racing